Klaus Köste (27 February 1943 – 14 December 2012) was a German gymnast. He won a gold medal in the vault at the 1972 Summer Olympics in Munich. He competed for East Germany and won bronze medals in the team all-around event in three Olympics, in 1964, 1968 and 1972. He was particularly strong on the horizontal bar, winning the 1971 and 1973 European championships and a bronze medal at the 1970 World championship in this event.

Köste started training in gymnastics at the age of six in Frankfurt (Oder), but later moved to Leipzig where he lived for the rest of his life. During his career he won 34 national titles, becoming one of the most successful German gymnast, together with Eberhard Gienger. In 1972 he was awarded the Patriotic Order of Merit. He retired from competitions in 1974 due to an Achilles tendon injury and became a trainer and high school teacher. In 1974–1976 he was the head coach of the East German women’s team and between 1976 and 1985 worked as the chief trainer of SC Leipzig. In parallel he taught sports at DHfK Leipzig. During the period of 1998–2002 he was an assistant to Gustav-Adolf Schur who was when a member of the Bundestag. He died from a heart failure in 2012.

References

1943 births
2012 deaths
Sportspeople from Frankfurt (Oder)
People from the Province of Brandenburg
Party of Democratic Socialism (Germany) politicians
German male artistic gymnasts
Olympic gymnasts of the United Team of Germany
Olympic gymnasts of East Germany
Gymnasts at the 1964 Summer Olympics
Gymnasts at the 1968 Summer Olympics
Gymnasts at the 1972 Summer Olympics
Olympic bronze medalists for the United Team of Germany
Olympic gold medalists for East Germany
Olympic bronze medalists for East Germany
Olympic medalists in gymnastics
Medalists at the 1972 Summer Olympics
Medalists at the 1968 Summer Olympics
Medalists at the 1964 Summer Olympics
Medalists at the World Artistic Gymnastics Championships
Recipients of the Patriotic Order of Merit in silver
European champions in gymnastics